The Gaslamp Quarter is a 16½-block neighborhood in the downtown area of San Diego, California. It extends from Broadway to Harbor Drive, and from 4th to 6th Avenue. 

Listed as a historic district on the National Register of Historic Places as Gaslamp Quarter Historic District, it includes 94 historic buildings, most of which were constructed in the Victorian Era; many are in use as restaurants, shops, entertainment venues, and nightclubs.

It is the site of various events and festivals, including Mardi Gras in the Gaslamp, Street Scene Music Festival, Taste of Gaslamp, and ShamROCK, a St. Patrick's Day event. Petco Park, home of the San Diego Padres, is one block away in the East Village neighborhood.

San Diegans generally refer to the area as "the Gaslamp", rarely "Gaslamp Quarter", as on the entryway arch and official city signage and banners.

History

In the 1860s, the area was known as New Town, in contrast to Old Town, the original Spanish colonial settlement of San Diego.  Intensive development began in 1867, when Alonzo Horton bought the land in hopes of creating a new city center closer to the bay, and chose 5th Avenue as its main street. 

After a period of urban decay, the neighborhood underwent urban renewal in the 1980s and 1990s.

It was rebranded the "Gaslamp Quarter" during the redevelopment and preservation efforts that occurred during the 1980s, though the streets were generally lit by arc lights, not gaslamps. Four new gaslamps have been installed at the intersection of Market Street and 5th Avenue.

Timeline
1850: William Heath Davis bought  in what would eventually become the Gaslamp Quarter.  Despite heavy investment from Davis, little development happened in this period.
1867: Real estate developer Alonzo Horton arrived in San Diego and purchased  of land in New Town for $265.  Major development began in the Gaslamp Quarter.

1880s to 1916: Known as the Stingaree, the area was a working class area, home to San Diego's first Chinatown, "Soapbox Row" and many saloons, gambling halls, and bordellos.
1912: Stingaree was the site of a free speech fight between socialists and city politicians which led to riots and the abduction by vigilantes of Emma Goldman's husband.
1916: the entire neighborhood of Stingaree was demolished and renamed by anti-vice campaigners.
1950s-1970s: The decaying Gaslamp Quarter became known as a "Sailor's Entertainment" district, with a high concentration of pornographic theaters, bookshops and massage parlors.
1970: Public interest in preserving buildings downtown started, especially in Gaslamp Quarter.
1976: The city adopted the Gaslamp Quarter Urban Design and Development Manual, aimed at preserving buildings in the area, and the redevelopment of Gaslamp Quarter as a national historic district.
1982: Gaslamp Quarter became the major focus of the redevelopments in downtown by the city of San Diego.
1992: Gaslamp Quarter Archway is installed and dedicated.

See also

 List of Gaslamp Quarter historic buildings
 U.S. Grant Hotel

References

External links

Gaslamp Quarter Association
Gaslamp Quarter Historical Foundation
Centre City Development Corporation
Information about Gaslamp Quarter Happenings
Information about Gaslamp Neighborhood

 
Entertainment districts in California
Historic districts in San Diego
Historic districts on the National Register of Historic Places in California
National Register of Historic Places in San Diego
Gaslamp Quarter
Urban communities in San Diego